Daniel Boloca (born 22 December 1998) is a Romanian professional footballer who plays as a midfielder for Serie B club Frosinone and the Romania national team. He has dual Romanian-Italian citizenship.

International career 
Boloca made his international debut for the Romania national team on November 17, 2022, replacing Răzvan Marin in the 84th minute in a friendly against Slovenia, ended in a 1-2 defeat for the Romanian team.

Later that year, Roberto Mancini, Italy's national team, announced that he is considering calling Boloca to the Italian side, despite his already match played for Romania. Boloca is eligible to play for Italy, holding both Romanian and Italian citizenship.

International stats

Personal life
Boloca is the older brother of defender Gabriele Boloca.

References

External links
 
  

1998 births
Living people
People from Chieri
Footballers from Piedmont
Sportspeople from the Metropolitan City of Turin
Italian footballers
Romanian footballers 
Italian people of Romanian descent
Association football midfielders
1. FC Tatran Prešov players
S.S.D. Pro Sesto players
A.S.D. Francavilla players
Frosinone Calcio players
Slovak Super Liga players  
Serie B players
Serie D players
Romania international footballers
Romanian expatriate footballers 
Expatriate footballers in Slovakia
Romanian expatriate sportspeople in Slovakia
Italian expatriate sportspeople in Slovakia
Expatriate footballers in Italy
Romanian expatriate sportspeople in Italy